The 43rd Indian Armoured Division was an armoured division of the Indian Army during World War II. It was formed in July 1942. It never saw any combat and was broken up to form the 44th Armoured Division in February 1943.

Formation

268th Indian Armoured Brigade
Converted to 268th Indian Infantry Brigade October 1942
51st Regiment Indian Armoured Corps (ex 7/5th Mahratta Light Infantry) 
53rd Regiment Indian Armoured Corps (ex MG/10th Baluch Regiment)
54th Regiment Indian Armoured Corps (ex 9/13th Frontier Force Rifles)

267th Indian Armoured Brigade
52nd Regiment Indian Armoured Corps
116th Regiment Royal Armoured Corps (ex 9th Btn Gordon Highlanders)
160th Regiment Royal Armoured Corps (ex 9th Btn Royal Sussex Regiment)
163rd Regiment Royal Armoured Corps (ex 13th Btn Sherwood Foresters)

268th Indian Infantry Brigade
8/13th Frontier Force Rifles
17/10th Baluch Regiment
17/7th Rajput Regiment
2/4th Bombay Grenadiers
5/4th Bombay Grenadiers
1st Assam Regiment
1st The Chamar Regiment
4/3rd Madras Regiment
Kalibahadur Regiment Nepal
Mahindra Dal Regiment Nepal
1/3rd Madras Regiment	
2nd The King's Own Scottish Borderers
2nd The South Lancashire Regiment
429 Field Company Indian Engineers

Divisional troops
18th Field Regiment Royal Artillery

References

Indian World War II divisions
British Indian Army divisions
Military units and formations established in 1942
Military units and formations of the British Empire in World War II